The Odisha football team is an Indian football team representing the state of Odisha, India. The Football Association of Odisha, a state association of All India Football Federation, controls the team. The team competes in Indian state football competitions including the Santosh Trophy Prior to 2014, the team competed as Orissa football team.

Stadium

Established in 1978, the Kalinga Stadium in Bhubaneswar, serves as the home ground of Odisha. The 15,000-capacity stadium has hosted several national and international tournaments including the I-League, Super Cup, and Women's Gold Cup. It is scheduled to host the 2022 FIFA U-17 Women's World Cup. The stadium is also the home base for the national and youth team camps. Indian Arrows, AIFF's developmental side, is also based at the Kalinga Stadium.

Personnel

Players
 The following 25 players were called up for the 2022–23 Santosh Trophy.

Results and fixtures

Matches
The following is a list of match results in the last 12 months, as well as any future matches that have been scheduled.

2022

2023

Management

Board of Directors

Honours
B. C. Roy Trophy (Junior National Football Championship)
 Winners (1): 1968–69
 Runners-up (2): 1961–62, 1976–77

Mir Iqbal Hussain Trophy (Sub-Junior National Football Championship)
 Winners (1): 2018–19
 Runners-up (4): 1993–94, 2000–01, 2012–13, 2015–16

Notable players
Below the players, are notable footballers who represented the Odisha football team.

 A. M. Bachan
 Deba Singh
 Rajendra Prasad Singh
 Rakesh Oram

References

Santosh Trophy teams
Football in Odisha